Hsunycteris is a genus of bats in the family Phyllostomidae and the only genus in the tribe Hsunycterini.

List of species
Genus Hsunycteris
Cadena's long-tongued bat, Hsunycteris cadenai
Dashe's nectar bat, Hsunycteris dashe
Patton's long-tongued bat, Hsunycteris pattoni
Thomas's nectar bat, Hsunycteris thomasi

References

 
Bat genera